The Estonian Cup is the national knockout competition in Estonian football. In 2012, the competition was unofficially rebranded as Evald Tipner's Cup. The winner will compete in UEFA Europa Conference League first qualifying round.

Finals

1Levadia were founded as FC Levadia Maardu. Until 2004 FC Levadia Tallinn were separate team owned by the steel company Levadia. In 2004 the clubs were merged FC Levadia Maardu were moved to Tallinn and became FC Levadia Tallinn, former FC Levadia Tallinn become their reserves as FC Levadia II Tallinn.

''D – Winning team were also Estonian Champions in the same calendar year, winning The Double.

Performance by club

Unofficial finals
The competition was not officially competed for between 1940 and 1991 due to first Soviet occupation, German occupation and second Soviet occupation.

References

External links
Estonia Cup Finals at RSSSF

 
1
National association football cups
1938 establishments in Estonia
Recurring sporting events established in 1938